Hephaestioides cyanipennis is a species of beetle in the family Cerambycidae, the only species in the genus Hephaestioides.

References

Necydalinae

Monotypic beetle genera